Gigapus is the tenth studio album by the Australian electronic music group Severed Heads. Recorded between 1992 and 1994, the album was first released in 1994 with a bonus CD-ROM disc titled Metapus that had additional multi-media content on it. Because of this, it is the first album released in Australia to include a CD-ROM disc. Due to the extra disc, the album was initially priced at $40 when it first came out. As with most of the Severed Heads discography, the album has been reissued multiple times.

Track listing
All songs written by Tom Ellard.

In 1996, a re-recorded and remixed version of "DOLLARex" (4:59) was substituted for the original.

15-17 of the 2001 reissue and 1-3 of the 2009 bonus disc were originally released as B-sides of the "Heart of the Party" CD single in Australia.

Personnel
Tom Ellard - vocals, production
David Smith - additional electronics
Comeron Miller - short wave radio
Lisa Maxwell - additional vocals on "Heart Of The Party"
David Allen - tambourine on "The Importance Of Hair" and "Somewhere Over The Gigapus"
Adrian Bolland - engineering
Kathy Naunton - mastering
Robert Racic - mastering
M.C. Newsagent - vocals on "Cabbalaland"
Boxcar - production on "Heart Of The Party"

Release history

References

External links
 
 Bandcamp page
 Review of Gigapus, claiming that it's Album of the Week of 13 December 1994 

Severed Heads albums
1994 albums